The 2011–12 Talk 'N Text Tropang Texters season was the 22nd season of the franchise in the Philippine Basketball Association (PBA).

Key dates
August 28: The 2011 PBA Draft took place in Robinson's Place Ermita, Manila.

Draft picks

Roster

Philippine Cup

Eliminations

Standings

Bracket

Quarterfinals

Talk 'N Text vs. Barako Bull

Semifinals

Talk 'N Text-Petron Blaze series

Finals

Commissioner's Cup

Eliminations

Standings

Bracket

Semifinals

Talk 'N Text–Barako Bull series

Finals

Governors Cup

Eliminations

Standings

Semifinals

Standings

Transactions

Trades

Pre-season

Subtractions

Recruited imports

References

TNT Tropang Giga seasons
Talk 'N Text